Alphabet of Fear is a 1961 Croatian film directed by Fadil Hadžić.

References

External links

1961 films
1960s Croatian-language films
Films directed by Fadil Hadžić
Jadran Film films
Croatian war drama films
Films set in Zagreb
Films set in 1943
1960s thriller drama films
Yugoslav war drama films
1961 directorial debut films
1961 drama films
War films set in Partisan Yugoslavia
1960s war drama films
Yugoslav World War II films
Croatian World War II films